Takashi Shimokawara (July 25, 1906 – March 11, 2011) was a Japanese centenarian from Kamaishi, Iwate. He is the current M100 world record holder in the shot put, discus and javelin throw. He also holds the M95 Japanese national record in the javelin, set at the age of 100. He was killed during the 2011 Tōhoku earthquake and tsunami at age 104.

Mr. Shimokawara would have a daily exercise routine that included a jog, press ups, squat thrusts and horizontal leg raises. He took up Masters athletics in 2004, at the age of 98.

References 

1906 births
2011 deaths
Japanese centenarians
Japanese male discus throwers
Japanese male javelin throwers
Japanese male shot putters
Japanese masters athletes
Natural disaster deaths in Japan
Victims of the 2011 Tōhoku earthquake and tsunami
World record holders in masters athletics
Men centenarians
20th-century Japanese people
21st-century Japanese people